Kathryn Warren is a female former athlete who competed for England.

Athletics career
Warren became the 1981 National champion after winning the AAA National Championships in the heptathlon. She represented England in the heptathlon, at the 1982 Commonwealth Games in Brisbane, Queensland, Australia.

References

English female athletes
Athletes (track and field) at the 1982 Commonwealth Games
English heptathletes
Commonwealth Games competitors for England